Staryye Sanny (İśke Hınnı) is a rural locality (a selo) in Pervomaysky Selsoviet, Blagovarsky District, Bashkortostan, Russia. The population was 417 as of 2010. There are 9 streets.

Geography 
Staryye Sanny is located 26 km west of Yazykovo (the district's administrative centre) by road. Pervomaysky is the nearest rural locality.

References 

Rural localities in Blagovarsky District